The Shreepali Basnet are a clan of the Chhetris originally from the Saipal, Far West Region who got their prominence in Gorkha district of Nepal. They mainly worship 'Masto' as their 'Kulayan' but saipali from Gorkha has changed their worship to "Sishakoti Mahadev", "Veerabhadra", "Mahakali" as their Kul Deuta and Aradhe Devi "Dakshinkali" as Istha deuta in style of Kunwar Rana. They became very powerful during the unification of Nepal and remained so until the emergence of Jung Bahadur Kunwar or later known as Jang Bahadur Rana.

The King's men
It is known that during the reign of King Prithivi Narayan Shah the Shreepali Basnyats of Gorkha were the leading military force. They were either highly ranked officers in the army or key figures in the king's court. King Prithvi Narayan Shah formed an alliance between the Basnyat and Pandey families of Gorkha in his quest for the unification of Nepal. Shivaram Singh Basnyat, the commander of Gorkhali forces belonged to Shreepali Basnyat clan. He was son of Jaya Ram Singh Basnyat.

Families strengthened
King Prithivi Narayan Shah is known to have arranged the marriage between General Kehar Singh Basnyat, son of General (Kazi) Shivaram Singh Basnyat and Chitra Devi, the daughter of General(Kaji) Kalu Pandey. Later, Chitra Devi constructed the Narayan temple in Timal Danda in honour of her Father-in-law Kaji Shivram Singh. Kehar Singh would go to Tibet to negotiate with its leaders to have Nepalese coins circulated there. He was a major military leader accredited with uniting the western districts and Kathmandu valley to Nepal. Kehar Singh would die at the battle of Satahun.

Kaji Abhiman Singh Basnyat, the third son of General (Kaji) Shivaram Singh Basnyat became the first Commander in Chief of a united Nepal after the death of General (Kaji) Kalu Pandey during the second attempt to capture Kirtipur. His father Shivram Singh was the first military leader of Gorkha who laid down his life in the campaign of unification of Nepal in 1746 in Chhaling, (Naldum) near Bhaktapur. Abhiman's two elder brothers were Kaji Naahar Singh and Kaji Kehar Singh. His youngest brother Kazi Dhaukal Simha Basnyat, who also became the governor of Kumaun, was the first owner of present Narayanhity Palace. Abhiman Singh died at the age of fifty-six in 1857 B.S. when he was sent to settle the area of Morang and Sunsari, then called Kaala Banzaar. It was seen as a great injustice for him to be sent to this area at his age when he was already a Mulkazi. He was reported to have suffered from fever, possibly malaria and died.

Recognition of the Basnyats
King Prithvi Narayan Shah has stressed the importance of the Basnyats in his poetic piece known as "Dibya Upadesh" or "Divine Counsel" in English. Here is a link to the translation of the "Dibya Upadesh" into English. This translation was done by Prawin Adhikari, from a transcription originally published by historian Baburam Acharya. Samudaya.org owns the copyrights to the article.

A quote from the Dibya Upadesh:

I said—"Now, I will make ties between the Pandeys and the Basnyats, so give your daughter to Sivaram Basnyat's son Keher Singh Basnyat," and the two houses were tied by marriage. Thus, after the conjugal tie, with the shields of the Pandes and the swords of the Basnyats I attacked Nepal.

Defenders of the throne
After the royal palace moved to Basantapur in Kathmandu, the Shreepali Basnyat's of Gorkha moved with the royal family, living close to the palace in Indra Chowk and Ason. In 1833 B. S. Kazi Abhiman Singh constructed a house for himself in Ason, which is known as Maan Mandir and it still exists today as Tilanga Ghar. The Basnyats shared a great amount of power in the royal court alongside the Pandey's and Thapa's. This alliance continued until the reign of King Rana Bahadur Shah, when Prime Minister Bhimsen Thapa came into power. But then followed a power struggle between the Pandeys and the Thapa's. The Basnyat's sided with the Pandey's because of their earlier marital links with them back in Gorkha, ultimately removing the Thapa's from power.

References

Notes

Sources

Nepalese royalty
Nepalese Hindus